Protestantism in France has existed in its various forms, starting with Calvinism and Lutheranism since the Protestant Reformation. John Calvin was a Frenchman, as were numerous other Protestant Reformers including William Farel, Pierre Viret and Theodore Beza, who was Calvin's successor in Geneva. Peter Waldo (Pierre Vaudes/de Vaux) was a merchant from Lyons, who founded a pre-Protestant group, the Waldensians. Martin Bucer was born a German in Alsace, which historically belonged to the Holy Roman Empire, but now belongs to France.

Hans J. Hillerbrand in his Encyclopedia of Protestantism claims the Huguenots reached as much as 10% of the French population on the eve of the St. Bartholomew's Day massacre, declining to 7-8% by the end of the 16th century, and further after heavy persecution began once again with the revocation of the Edict of Nantes by Louis XIV.

Protestants were granted a degree of religious freedom following the Edict of Nantes, but it ceased with the Edict of Fontainebleau. The Protestant minority was persecuted, and a majority of Huguenots fled the country, leaving isolated communities like the one in the Cevennes region, which survives to this day.

Today, Protestants in France number at over one million, representing about two to three percent of the country's population. A renewed interest in Protestantism has been brought by numerous Evangelical Protestants, while the membership of Calvinist and Lutheran churches has stagnated; many of the latter two confessions have merged into the United Protestant Church of France.

Major groups

Waldensians

A Christian sect or movement, sometimes characterized as proto-Protestant, organized around the teachings of Peter Waldo, a wealthy merchant of Lyon who lived in the 12th century. The Waldensians later moved to Northern Italy, where they experienced near decimation from Catholic authorities until the Reformation, when they affiliated with the Calvinists and other Reformed Christian groups of Switzerland, Germany and France. In the Duchy of Savoy, the Waldensians frequently faced persecution when "Sun King" Louis XIV of France put the dukes under pressure to eradicate all Protestant presence across his borders during the Savoyard–Waldensian wars (1655–1690). The group still exists in Italy, Germany, Brazil and the United States.

Huguenots

The Huguenots of the Reformed Church of France were followers of John Calvin, and became the major Protestant sect in France. A large portion of the population died in massacres or were deported from French territory following the Revocation of the Edict of Nantes in 1685. Today, the Huguenots number about one million, or about two percent of the population; They are most concentrated in southeastern France and the Cévennes region in the south. The Calvinist congregations in Alsace and Moselle are organised as the Protestant Reformed Church of Alsace and Lorraine (EPRAL).

Lutherans

Lutherans formed a minority among the overall French Protestants. Their congregations were strengthened by Lutheran immigrants, mostly settling in economically prosperous places. With the French conquest of German-speaking regions along the Rhine beginning in the 17th century, the Kingdom acquired significant Lutheran populations. Under Napoleonic religious legislation of 1801 and 1802 also French Lutheranism was reorganized forming the Église de la Confession d'Augsbourg de France, established as a nationwide synod and body. It renamed as Evangelical Lutheran Church of France in 1906. In 1872, the Protestant Church of Augsburg Confession of Alsace and Lorraine (EPCAAL) had branched off, competent since for most Lutheran congregations in Alsace and Moselle.

Diffusion 
In a study regarding the various religions of France, based on 51 surveys held by the IFOP in the period 2011-2014, so based on a sample of 51.770 answers, there were 17.4% of Protestants in the Bas-Rhin, 7.3% in the Haut-Rhin, 7.2% in the Gard, 6.8% in the Drôme and 4.2% in the Ardèche. In the other departments this presence is residual, with, for example, only 0.5% in Côte-d'Or and in the Côtes-d'Armor.

History

Reformation in France

French Wars of Religion (1562–1598)

Huguenot rebellions (1621–1629)

Significant decline under Louis XIV

Under his rule, the Edict of Nantes which granted rights to Huguenots was abolished. The revocation effectively forced Huguenots to emigrate or convert in a wave of dragonnades. Louis XIV managed to virtually destroy the French Protestant minority, which had survived more than 150 years of wars and persecution under previous French kings.

Further persecution

Persecution formally stopped with the Edict of Versailles in 1787, although it was not until the Declaration of the Rights of Man and of the Citizen of 1789 that Protestants were fully emancipated.

Napoleon and Protestants

Later establishments

In 1927 some congregations of EPCAAL branched off and established a separate Evangelical Lutheran church and synod for France and Belgium. Many Evangelical Protestant currents would be established in France in the post-WWII period, many of which are part of charismatic or Pentecostal movements. These movements often succeeded older and smaller movements that were largely indigenous or established through the efforts of European, mainly British, Evangelicals.

Apology to the Huguenots
In October 1985, to commemorate the tercentenary of the Revocation of the Edict of Nantes, Francois Mitterrand as president of France formally apologised to the descendants of Huguenots around the world for past governmental persecution of their forebears.  At the same time, a special postage stamp was released to honour the Huguenots. In a recognition of sorts of their formerly abused rights, the stamp states that France is the home of the Huguenots ("Accueil des Huguenots").

A new rise of Protestantism

While Protestantism is declining in much of Europe, France may be an exception, where it now is claimed to be stable in number or even growing slightly.

Protestants form a minority of 3% in France. Various churches shaped by Evangelicalism have been the main reason behind the current rise of Protestantism in the country, while Calvinists and Lutherans are declining, and in 2013 large parts of these groups merged into the United Protestant Church of France.

In 2019, it was reported that a new Evangelical church is built every 10 days and now counts 700,000 followers across France.

See also 
 Martin Luther
 Jean Calvin
 Virtual Museum of Protestantism
 Conference of Protestant Churches in Latin Countries of Europe
 Religion in France

References

Further reading
 Dagon, Gérard. Petites églises de France. [S.l.]: Édité par l'auteur; [S.l.: Printed by] M. Hagondange, 1977. N.B.: Concerns non-Catholic Christian groups and also non-Christian religions in France.
 Mehl, Roger. Le Protestantisme français dans la société actuelle: 1945-1980, in series, Histoire et société, n'o 1. Genève: Éditions Labor et Fides, 1982. Without ISBN

External links

Protestantism in France
France